Maciej Maik (26 August 1984 - 28 March 2003) was a Polish Paralympic swimmer who competed at 2000 Summer Paralympics and won three medals. He was also a World champion in backstroke and silver medalist in breaststroke.

Death
Maik took his own life and was found dead in his apartment in Tychy.

References

1984 births
2003 suicides
People from Tychy
Paralympic swimmers of Poland
Swimmers at the 2000 Summer Paralympics
Medalists at the 2000 Summer Paralympics
Medalists at the World Para Swimming Championships
Suicides by hanging in Poland
Polish male backstroke swimmers
Polish male breaststroke swimmers
Polish male medley swimmers
S10-classified Paralympic swimmers
21st-century Polish people